The Kaliningrad question ( or ;  or ;  or) is a political question concerning the status of Kaliningrad Oblast as an exclave of Russia, and its isolation from the rest of the Baltic region following the 2004 enlargement of the European Union.

In Western media, the region is often discussed in relation to the deployment of missile systems, initially as a response to the deployment of missile defense systems in Poland and the Czech Republic. Russia views the region as a vital element of its ability to project power in the Baltic region.

A fringe position also considers the return of the province to Germany from the Russian Federation, or its independence from both. The former question is mostly hypothetical, as the German government has stated that it has no claim to it and has formally renounced in international law any right to any lands east of the Oder by ratifying the Treaty on the Final Settlement with Respect to Germany.

History

Kaliningrad, or Königsberg, had been a part of the Teutonic Order, Duchy of Prussia (for some time a Polish vassal), Kingdom of Prussia, and the German Empire for 684 years before the Second World War. The lands of Prussia were originally inhabited by Baltic tribes, the Old Prussians, with their language becoming extinct by the 18th century.

The incorporation of the Königsberg area of East Prussia to Russia became a stated war aim of the Soviet Union at the Tehran Conference in December 1943. In 1945, at the end of World War II, the city was captured by the Soviet Union (see Battle of Königsberg). As agreed by the Allies at the Potsdam Conference, northern East Prussia, including Königsberg, was given to the USSR. Specifically, it became an exclave of the Russian Soviet Federative Socialist Republic, separated from the rest of the Republic by the Lithuanian and Byelorussian SSRs. The southern parts of East Prussia were transferred to Poland. In 1946, the name of the city of Königsberg was changed to Kaliningrad.

In October 1945, only about 5,000 Soviet civilians lived in the territory. Between October 1947 and October 1948, about 100,000 Germans were forcibly moved to Germany. About 400,000 Soviet civilians arrived by 1948. Some moved voluntarily, but as the number of willing settlers proved insufficient, collective farms were given quotas of how many people they had to send to Kaliningrad. Often they sent the least socially desirable individuals, such as alcoholics or the uneducated.

In the 1950s, Nikita Khrushchev suggested that the Lithuanian SSR should annex Kaliningrad Oblast. The offer was refused by the Lithuanian Communist Party leader Antanas Sniečkus, who did not wish to alter the ethnic composition of his republic. In the late Soviet era, rumors spread that the Oblast might be converted into a homeland for Soviet Germans.

Kaliningrad Oblast remained part of the Soviet Union until its dissolution in 1991, and since then has been an exclave of the Russian Federation. After the Soviet collapse, some descendants of the expellees and refugees traveled to the city to examine their roots. According to the 2010 Russian Census, 7,349 ethnic Germans live in the Oblast, making up 0.8% of the population.

In Germany, the status of Kaliningrad (Königsberg) was a mainstream political issue until the 1960s, when the shifting political discourse increasingly associated similar views with right-wing revisionism.

According to a Der Spiegel article published in 2010, in 1990 the West German government received a message from the Soviet general Geli Batenin, offering to return Kaliningrad. The offer was never seriously considered by the Bonn government, who saw reunification with the East as its priority. However, this story was later denied by Mikhail Gorbachev.

In 2001, the EU was alleged to be in talks with Russia to arrange an association agreement with the Kaliningrad Oblast, at a time when Russia could not repay £22 billion debt owed to Berlin, which may have given Germany some influence over the territory. Claims of "buying back" Kaliningrad (Königsberg) or other "secret deals" were repudiated by both sides.

Another rumor about a debt-related deal, published by the Russian weekly Nash Continent, alleged that Putin and Edmund Stoiber had agreed on the gradual return of Kaliningrad in return for waiving the country's $50 billion debt to Germany.

After annexation of Crimea by the Russian Federation in 2014, some newspapers proposed that Kaliningrad Oblast should be return to West. On 28 April 2014, The Baltic Times proposed that the West should take back Kaliningrad from Russia in exchange.  This proposal was 
quoted by several scholary articles. 

Regardless of the reality, Russia's annexation of Crimea opened doors to claim Kaliningrad by others.

A few months after the 2022 Russian invasion of Ukraine, Lithuania started implementing EU sanctions, which blocked about 50% of the goods being imported into Kaliningrad by rail, not including food, medicine, or passenger travel. Russia protested the sanctions and announced it would increase shipments by sea.

Support for independence
Since the early 1990s there has been a proposal for independence of the Kaliningrad Oblast from Russia and the formation of a "fourth Baltic state" by some of the local people. The Baltic Republican Party was founded on 1 December 1993 with the aim of founding an autonomous Baltic Republic.

Support for irredentism
Inesis Feldmanis, head of the Faculty of History and Philosophy at the University of Latvia, has been quoted saying that the Soviet Union's annexation of Kaliningrad is "an error in history".

The Freistaat Preußen Movement, one of the most active offshoots of the Reichsbürger movement, considers the Russian (and German) government as illegitimate and see themselves as the rightful rulers of the region. As of 2017, the movement is split into two competing factions, one based in Königsfeld, Rhineland-Palatinate and the other in Bonn.

In Lithuania

Some political groups in Lithuania claim parts of Kaliningrad Oblast between the Pregel and Nemunas rivers (an area known as Lithuania Minor), but they have little influence. Linas Balsys, a deputy in the Lithuanian parliament, has argued that the status of the exclave should be discussed at international levels.

In 1994, the former Lithuanian head of state Vytautas Landsbergis called for the separation and "decolonization" of Kaliningrad from Russia. In December 1997, the Lithuanian parliament member Romualdas Ozolas expressed his view that Kaliningrad should become an independent republic.

After the annexation of Crimea in 2014, the political analyst Laurynas Kasčiūnas called for a revisiting of the Potsdam Agreement. He claims that residents of Kaliningrad would support a referendum to separate from Russia. The notion of a Lithuanian claim has been brushed off by Russian media, even the liberal Novaya Gazeta newspaper dismissing it as a "geopolitical fantasy".

In Poland
More than in the form of Polish irredentism over the Kaliningrad Oblast, a Polish annexation of the region has been more mentioned by Russian media, which has accused the Polish authorities of preparing to incorporate the region. These accusations stemmed from online comments made by readers of an article published on the Polish newspaper Gazeta Wyborcza: while the article itself did not mention any Polish alleged annexation desire, the comments suggested that the Kaliningrad Oblast should belong to Poland. Pro-Kremlin media such as Pravda.ru misleadingly reported this as an attempt by the Polish government to annex the region. Stanisław Żaryn, spokeperson for the Polish Minister Coordinator for Special Services, dismissed the allegation as "fake news".

German resettlement attempts

In the 1990s, a far-right group calling itself Gesellschaft für Siedlungsförderung in Trakehnen attempted to establish a settlement in Yasnaya Polyana (Trakehnen in German). Fundraising by the organization Aktion Deutsches Königsberg financed the construction of a German-language school and housing in the neighboring village of Amtshagen. Most of the settlers were Russian Germans from the Caucasus and Kazakhstan, rather than returnees.

Several dilapidated houses were bought and renovated; tractors, trucks, building materials and machinery were imported into the village. The relatively high salaries attracted newcomers, and the ethnic German population rose to about 400 inhabitants. The construction of a second settlement in the outskirts of Trakehnen, named Agnes-Miegel-Siedlung, began in 1998.

Relations with the local Russian administration were initially cordial, but the activities of the group were suppressed by the Russian government after being publicized by German media. Dietmar Munier, the initiator of the project, was banned from traveling to Kaliningrad Oblast. In 2006, he sold his stake in the association to one Alexander Mantai, who turned it into a for-profit concern and evicted the original settlers. The association was liquidated in 2015 for violating the Russian law on NGOs.

In the 1990s, a group affiliated to Manfred Roeder collected donations to build housing for ethnic Germans in the village of Olkhovatka, east of Kaliningrad.

Official positions
Although negotiations in 2001 were instigated around a possible Russian trade deal with the EU, that would have put the exclave within Germany's economic sphere of influence, the current German government has indicated no interest in recovering Kaliningrad Oblast. The governments of Poland and Lithuania similarly recognize Kaliningrad as part of Russia, as does the European Union. Germany formally waived all territorial claims to the former East Prussia as part of the Two Plus Four Agreement that led to German reunification. In July 2005, the German Chancellor Gerhard Schröder declared that "in its heart [the city] will always be called Königsberg", but stated that Germany did not have any territorial claim to it. According to Ulrich Speck, the prospect of returning Kaliningrad to Germany lacks support in Germany, even among fringe nationalist groups. In 2004, the German politician Jürgen Klimke asked the German federal government about its view on the establishment of a Lithuanian-Russian-Polish euroregion, to be named "Prussia". The initiator denied any revanchist connotations to the proposal.

After the collapse of the Soviet Union, Russia's claim to Kaliningrad was not contested by any government, though some groups in Lithuania called for the annexation of the province, or parts of it.

Poland has made no claim to Kaliningrad, and is seen as being unlikely to do so, as it was a net beneficiary of the Potsdam Agreement, which also decided the status of Kaliningrad.

In Belarus 
In 2019 Alexander Lukashenko suggested that the Kaliningrad Oblast could become Belarusian in the future and compared it with the 2014 Russian annexation of Crimea.

See also

 Prussia
 Prussian nationalism
 Restriction of transit with the Kaliningrad Oblast
 Karelian question
 Kuril Islands dispute
 Landsmannschaft Ostpreußen, organization for East Prussian refugees/expellees
 Suwałki Gap
 Královec Region, a satirical Czech annexation of Kaliningrad

Notes

References
 

Germany–Russia relations
Lithuania–Russia relations
German irredentism
Lithuanian irredentism
Politics of Kaliningrad Oblast
Political controversies
National questions